Ashley Spencer (born June 8, 1993) is an American track and field athlete who competes in the 400 metres and the 400 metres hurdles. In the 400m hurdles, she is the 2016 Olympic bronze medalist. In the 400m, she is the 2012 World Junior Champion and the 2016 World Indoor silver medalist. She is coached by 1996 Olympic bronze medalist Tonya Buford-Bailey.

Early life
Born June 8, 1993 in Indianapolis, Indiana, Spencer attended the University of Illinois at Urbana–Champaign, where she ran for the Illinois Fighting Illini and won 2 NCAA titles. She then attended the University of Texas at Austin, where she ran for the Texas Longhorns. Her uncle is Steve Smith, the 1995 Pan American Games silver medalist in the high jump.

International career
At the 2012 World Junior Championships Spencer won gold medals in both the 400 meters and the 4x400 meter relay.

At the 2013 USA Outdoor Track and Field Championships Spencer finished third in the 400m.  This finish assured her selection for the 2013 World Championships in Moscow. At the World Championships she ran 51.48 in the 400m heats to qualify for the semifinals, where she was eliminated running 51.80. She went on to win a gold medal in the 4 × 400 m relay, along with Jessica Beard, Natasha Hastings and Francena McCorory.

Spencer won a silver medal in the 400m in 51.77 and a gold medal in the 4 × 400 m relay at the 2016 IAAF World Indoor Championships in Portland, Oregon. Later that year at the United States Olympic Trials, she finished second behind Dalilah Muhammad in the 400m hurdles in a personal best of 54.02, to earn selection for the Rio Olympics. She also finished seventh in the 400m final at the trials in 51.09. At the Rio Olympics, she won the bronze medal in the 400m hurdles in a personal best time of 53.72 seconds.

In June 2017, Spencer moved into the world all-time top 25 when she improved her 400m hurdles best to 53.11 seconds, finishing fourth at the U.S. Championships, in a race won by Dalilah Muhammad in 52.64.

References

External links 
 
 
 
 
 
 

Living people
1993 births
American female sprinters
World Athletics Championships athletes for the United States
Athletes (track and field) at the 2016 Summer Olympics
Olympic bronze medalists for the United States in track and field
Medalists at the 2016 Summer Olympics
World Athletics Championships medalists
Illinois Fighting Illini women's track and field athletes
Track and field athletes from Indianapolis
Texas Longhorns women's track and field athletes
World Athletics Indoor Championships winners
World Athletics Indoor Championships medalists
World Athletics Championships winners
Track and field athletes from Indiana